The Ioana gas field natural gas field located on the continental shelf of the Black Sea. It was discovered in 2010 and developed by Sterling Resources. It began production in 2015 and produces natural gas and condensates. The total proven reserves of the Ioana gas field are around 653 billion cubic feet (18.7 km³), and production is around 110 million cubic feet/day (3.1×106m³) in 2015.

References

Black Sea energy
Natural gas fields in Romania